The 5% Club is a movement of employers working to create a shared prosperity across the UK by campaigning for greater skills training, through ‘earn and learn’ job opportunities.

Members aim to achieve 5% of their workforce in 'earn and learn' positions (including apprentices, sponsored students and graduates on formalised training schemes) within five years of joining the club.

History 
The 5% Club was founded by Leo Quinn in 2013. 

Its stated purpose is to address the high levels of youth unemployment and chronic skills shortage in today's society. Its secretariat is increasingly working with government to provide a bridge between the corporate and public sector, with Members of Parliament describing it as the 'gold standard' for businesses supporting skill development. The Confederation of British Industry (CBI) has also endorsed The 5% Club and upon its launch, publicly urged British industry to strive to commit to the 5% employment target.

In 2018, The 5% Club gained charitable status.

Membership 
As of November 2022 The 5% Club has more than 750 members. They are UK companies wishing to invest in skills creation and employability. Members of The Club pledge to have at least 5% of its employees in earn and learn roles within 5-years of joining.. Members are required to publish an annual report on their progress.

References 

Trade associations based in the United Kingdom
2013 establishments in England